Matamoros is one of the 38 municipalities of Coahuila, in north-eastern Mexico. The municipal seat lies at Matamoros. The municipality covers an area of 1003.7 km².

As of 2005, the municipality had a total population of 99,707.

References

Municipalities of Coahuila